Thornton Hall may refer to:

 Thornton Hall, Buckinghamshire, also known as Thornton College, a manor that is currently a boarding school near Stony Stratford, Buckinghamshire, England
 Thornton Hall, High Coniscliffe, a manor house in Darlington, County Durham, England
 Thornton Watlass Hall, an estate in Thornton Watlass, North Yorkshire, England
 Thornton Hall, a formerly proposed prison site in north Dublin, Ireland to replace Mountjoy Prison
 Thornton Hall, main academic building of the University of Virginia School of Engineering and Applied Science
 Thorton Hall, writer of Love Romance of Aristocracy and Love Affairs of the Courts of Europe

See also
 Thornton Academy, a private school in Saco, York, Maine, United States
 Thornton House (disambiguation)
 Thornton Hough, Wirral, Merseyside, England
 Thornton Manor, in the village of Thornton Hough
 Nancy Drew: Ghost of Thornton Hall, video game
 Thornton (disambiguation)